In the Magic Mirror is an abstract oil painting produced in 1934 by the Swiss-based German artist Paul Klee. It is now in the collection of the Art Institute of Chicago.

Description
It features a blank face on which a vertical line snakes from top to bottom, "taking a line for a walk", as Klee was wont to say. In the process three faces evolve, one looking left, one looking right and one looking out of the canvas with two tear-shaped eyes. Below the faces is a single isolated black heart.

Degenerate artist
Produced shortly after Klee was branded a degenerate artist by the ruling Nazi Party in 1933, with the subsequent loss of his position in Germany and an enforced move to Switzerland, the picture appears to represent his disillusionment. The knotted brow, the tear-shaped eyes and the black heart communicate anxiety, distress and bitterness.

See also
List of works by Paul Klee

References

External links

1934 paintings
Paintings by Paul Klee
Paintings in the collection of the Art Institute of Chicago